WESN (88.1 FM) is a radio station  broadcasting an Alternative format. Owned by Illinois Wesleyan University, the station serves Bloomington-Normal, Illinois. WESN's main studio is located in the basement of Illinois Wesleyan's Kemp Hall.  Most WESN programs are staffed by students, but the station is open to willing community volunteers.

References

External links
http://wesn.org/

ESN
ESN
Radio stations established in 1983
1983 establishments in Illinois